Yuldashev (Cyrillic: Юлдашев, also Йўлдошев) is the surname of the following persons:

 Akram Yuldashev (1963-2010/2011), founder of Akromiya, an Islamist organization operating in Uzbekistan
 Daniyar Yuldashev (born 1996), Kazakhstani karate fighter
 Dilshod Yuldashev (born 1976), Uzbekistani boxer
 Ibrokhimkhalil Yuldashev (born 2001), Uzbekistani footballer
 Muhammad Ali Yuldashev (born 1991), Uzbek actor, screenwriter, producer and singer
 Nigmatilla Yuldashev (born 1962), Uzbek lawyer and politician
 Ramil Yuldashev (born 1961), Soviet and Ukrainian ice hockey winger
 Takhir Yuldashev (1967-2009), Uzbek Islamist militant, cofounder of the Islamic Movement of Uzbekistan 
 Ulugbek Yuldashev (born 1985), entrepreneur from Kyrgyzstan
	

Surnames